Nicanor Segundo Parra Sandoval (5 September 1914 – 23 January 2018) was a Chilean poet and physicist. He was considered one of the most influential Chilean poets of the Spanish language in the 20th century, often compared with Pablo Neruda. Parra described himself as an "anti-poet," due to his distaste for standard poetic pomp and function; after recitations he would exclaim "Me retracto de todo lo dicho" ("I take back everything I said").

Life

Parra, the son of a schoolteacher, was born in 1914 in San Fabián de Alico, near Chillán, in Chile. He came from the artistically prolific Parra family of performers, musicians, artists, and writers. His sister, Violeta Parra, was a folk singer, as was his brother Roberto Parra Sandoval.

In 1933, he entered the Instituto Pedagógico of the University of Chile, where he qualified as a teacher of mathematics and physics in 1938, one year after the publication of his first book, Cancionero sin Nombre. After teaching in Chilean secondary schools, in 1943 he enrolled in Brown University in the United States to study physics. In 1948, he attended Oxford University to study cosmology. He returned to Chile as a professor at the Universidad de Chile in 1952. Parra served as a professor of theoretical physics at the University of Chile from 1952 to 1991, and was a visiting professor at Louisiana State University, New York University, and Yale University. He read his poetry in England, France, Russia, Mexico, Cuba, and the United States. He published dozens of books.

As a young man, he was promoted by Gabriela Mistral and Pablo Neruda. He came to Mistral's attention when she visited Chillán.  The national anthem was played in her honor, as Latin America's first Nobel laureate;  at its conclusion,  Parra leapt onto the stage and recited a poem he'd written for her the previous night.  Mistral, standing for the anthem, remained standing until Parra finished, and later introduced him to important people in Santiago as a poet of future global renown. Subsequently, Neruda arranged for Parra's collection Poemas y Antipoemas to be published in Buenos Aires, in 1954.

Poemas y Antipoemas is a classic of Latin American literature, one of the most influential Spanish poetry collections of the twentieth century. It is cited as an inspiration by American Beat writers such as Allen Ginsberg.

A fictionalized version of Parra appeared in Alejandro Jodorowsky's autobiographical film Endless Poetry (2016).

Death 
Parra died on 23 January 2018, at 7:00 am, in La Reina in Santiago de Chile, at the age of 103.

Awards

Parra was proposed on four occasions for the Nobel Prize in Literature. On 1 December 2011, Parra won the Spanish Ministry of Culture's Cervantes Prize, the most important literary prize in the Spanish-speaking world. On 7 June 2012, he won the Pablo Neruda Ibero-American Poetry Award.

List of works
 Cancionero sin nombre (Songbook without a Name), 1937.
 Poemas y antipoemas (Poems and Antipoems), 1954; Nascimento, 1956; Cátedra, 2005, 
 La cueca larga (The Long Cueca), 1958
 Versos de salón (Parlor Verses), 1962
 Manifiesto (Manifesto), 1963
 Canciones rusas (Russian Songs), 1967
 Obra gruesa (Thick Works), 1969
 Los profesores (The Teachers), 1971
 Artefactos (Artifacts), 1972
 Sermones y prédicas del Cristo de Elqui (Sermons and Teachings of the Christ of Elquí),  1977
 Nuevos sermones y prédicas del Cristo de Elqui (New Sermons and Teachings of the Christ of Elquí), 1979
 El anti-Lázaro (The Anti-Lazarus), 1981
 Plaza Sésamo (Sesame Street), 1981
 Poema y antipoema de Eduardo Frei (Poem and Antipoem of Eduardo Frei), 1982
 Cachureos, ecopoemas, guatapiques, últimas prédicas, 1983
 Chistes parRa desorientar a la policía (Jokes to Confuse the Police), 1983
 Coplas de Navidad (Christmas Couplets), 1983
 Poesía política (Political Poetry), 1983
 Hojas de Parra (Grape Leaves / Pages of Parra (Spanish pun)), 1985
 Nicanor Parra: biografía emotiva (Nicanor Parra: Emotional Biography), Ediciones Rumbos, 1988
 Poemas para combatir la calvicie (Poems to Combat Baldness), 1993
 Páginas en blanco (White Pages), 2001
 Lear, Rey & Mendigo (Lear, King & Beggar), 2004
 Obras completas I & algo + (Complete Works I and Something More), 2006
 Discursos de Sobremesa (After Dinner Declarations), 2006
 Obras Completas II & algo + (Complete Works II and Something More), 2011
 Así habló Parra en El Mercurio, entrevistas dadas al diario chileno entre 1968 y 2007 (Thus Spoke Parra in El Mercurio, Interviews Given to the Chilean Newspaper Between 1968 and 2007), 2012
 El último apaga de luz (The Last One to Leave Turns Off the Lights), 2017

English translations
 Poems and antipoems:.  Edited by Miller Williams. Translators: Fernando Alegría and others. New Directions Pub. Corp., 1967

References

External links

 Nicanor Parra Official website
 Nicanor Parra website at the Universidad de Chile
 La Antipoesía de Parra y el lenguaje del artefacto  UNESCO
 El Proyecto de la Antipoesía de Nicanor Parra
 Nicanor Parra en Biblioteca Virtual Cervantes
Nicanor Parra recorded at the Library of Congress for the Hispanic Division’s audio literary archive on Apr. 14, 1970

1914 births
2018 deaths
Chilean male poets
Chilean physicists
People from Punilla Province
Nicanor Parra
National Prize for Literature (Chile) winners
Premio Cervantes winners
University of Chile alumni
Brown University alumni
Alumni of St Catherine's College, Oxford
Academic staff of the University of Chile
Chilean centenarians
20th-century Chilean poets
20th-century Chilean male writers
Men centenarians